The 1948 South Carolina Gamecocks football team was an American football team that represented the University of South Carolina as a member of the Southern Conference (SoCon) during the 1948 college football season. In their eighth season under head coach Rex Enright, the Gamecocks compiled an overall record of 3–5 with a mark of 1–3 in conference play, placing 13th in the SoCon.

Schedule

References

South Carolina
South Carolina Gamecocks football seasons
South Carolina Gamecocks football